The Very Next Of is the second and final album by the Drugs. It was released in 2004. Track 14, "I Was a Teenage Voter", was released on Rock Against Howard two weeks before the Drugs album's release. The album has since been deleted from Shock Records' catalogue, however it was rereleased in late 2011 with the Masking Agents box set.

The cover is a parody of the cover to their previous album Music's in Trouble, with part of an updated black and white photo of the Drugs laid over a low quality scan of the album cover of Music's in Trouble. Track 1 is a parody of the same track from Music's in Trouble, where the track (remastered) is played for 15 seconds but then interrupted by a Drug saying "This is exactly how we started the last album!".

The album had no singles, but the songs "Rogue States" and "Appease Your God and Kill a Mormon" were played on radio in the lead up to the album's release. A music video was filmed for "Rogue States".

Track list

Personnel 
 Ian Baddley – vocals, keyboards
 Benny Drill – guitar
 Mark Tracks – guitar
 David Live – bass
 Harry Snow – drums

External links 
 The Very Next Of at Discogs

2004 albums
The Drugs albums